Jiansanjiang is an administrative area of 230,000 in eastern Heilongjiang province, China. It was established as a nongken farm.

Agriculture 

Being a former agricultural reclamation land, Jiansanjiang has a rich history of agriculture, and is known for having areas of chernozemic soil. The city is discussed in detail in academic papers on Agriculture in China: notably China Agricultural University has an experimental station looking at rice varieties in the city.

Jiansanjiang is known as China's green rice city, and its Honghe farm was the first modernised farm in the whole of China, making use of agricultural drones and other technologies.

Transportation 

Jiansanjiang Shidi Airport was opened in October 2017. By road, Jiansanjiang connects to the G1011 via the S11 Jianji Expressway.

Jiansanjiang also connects to Harbin (via Jiamusi) and Fuyuan by rail.

Science 

The asteroid 207723 Jiansanjiang is named after the city.

References 

Cities in Heilongjiang